Nickolson Thomas (born 21 March 1982) is a retired Trinidadian football player.

Career statistics

International

References

External links
 

1982 births
Living people
Trinidad and Tobago footballers
Trinidad and Tobago international footballers
Association football defenders
2007 CONCACAF Gold Cup players
W Connection F.C. players
Point Fortin Civic F.C. players